Chalu (also Romanized as Chālū) is a village in Tameshkol Rural District, Nashta District, Tonekabon County, Mazandaran Province, Iran. At the 2006 census, its population was 177, in 44 families.

References 

Populated places in Tonekabon County